Soyuz TM-10 was the tenth expedition to the Russian Space Station Mir.

Crew

Mission highlights

TM-10 marked the return to earth of Japanese reporter Toyohiro Akiyama.

The Soyuz arrived at Mir's aft port with four passengers: quail for cages in Kvant-2. A quail had laid an egg en route to the station. It was returned to Earth, along with 130 kg of experiment results and industrial products, in Soyuz TM-9. The spacecraft landed without incident.

It spent 131 days attached to Mir. A camera was installed in the descent module as part of the agreement with Akiyama's network to film the reactions of the returning cosmonauts.

References

Crewed Soyuz missions
1990 in the Soviet Union
Spacecraft launched in 1990